Moreton School is a co-educational secondary school located one-mile north east of Wolverhampton City Centre in the West Midlands of England. The school accommodates over 700 pupils.

History
It was originally formed as a boys school, Bushbury Hill School, in 1931, but later became co-educational and was renamed Moreton Community School.
Previously a community school administered by Wolverhampton City Council, in March 2017 Moreton Community School converted to academy status and was renamed Moreton School. The school is now sponsored by the Amethyst Academies Trust.

Although the school technically has a sixth form provision, in practice all sixth form education within the Amethyst Academies Trust now takes place at Aldersley High School. A new sixth form centre was built at Aldersley High School in 2019.

Facilities
The school's facilities include:
 Dance studio
 Drama studio
 Music recording studios
 Art studios
 5 D&T labs
7 Science labs
 Community Hub
 And a theatre, gymnasium, sports hall, tennis courts & large playing fields.

References

External links
Moreton School official website 
Moreton on Facebook
Moreton on Twitter

Secondary schools in Wolverhampton
Educational institutions established in 1931
1931 establishments in England
Academies in Wolverhampton